Group C of the 2001 Fed Cup Americas Zone Group II was one of four pools in the Americas Zone Group II of the 2001 Fed Cup. Three teams competed in a round robin competition, with each team being assigned to its respective play-off region.

Costa Rica vs. Bermuda

Panama vs. Antigua and Barbuda

Costa Rica vs. Antigua and Barbuda

Bermuda vs. Panama

Costa Rica vs. Panama

Bermuda vs. Antigua and Barbuda

See also
Fed Cup structure

References

External links
 Fed Cup website

2001 Fed Cup Americas Zone